California Proposition 20 was a proposed initiated state statute on the ballot in the 2020 California elections. This initiative would have added more crimes to the list of non-violent felonies for which early parole is restricted, and would have required DNA collection for certain misdemeanors.

According to its ballot summary, Proposition 20 would have

 limited access to parole programs established for non-violent offenders who have completed the full term of their primary offense by eliminating eligibility for certain offenses;
 changed the standards and requirements related to Parole in California;
 authorized felony charges in cases of retail theft where the value of stolen goods is between $250 and $950; and
 would have required individuals convicted of certain misdemeanors to submit DNA to a state database.

Proposition 20 was decisively rejected by 62% of Californians, a margin of 24 percentage points. Observers partly attributed its failure to the George Floyd protests bringing negative attention to punitive criminal justice policies.

Support 
This measure was being supported by law enforcement unions, grocery store chains, and current California State Assembly member and former law enforcement officer Jim Cooper.

Proponents cited that these changes are to close exceptions in the original text of Proposition 47 that allowed access to early parole or probation for individuals convicted of sex trafficking of children, rape of an unconscious person, felony assault with a deadly weapon, battery on a police officer or freighter, and felony domestic violence.

Opposition 
The measure was opposed by the Chan Zuckerberg Initiative, former governor Jerry Brown, and the American Civil Liberties Union. The Los Angeles Times announced its opposition to the Proposition in October 2020.

Opponents cited the impact that the COVID-19 pandemic has had on crowded prisons, and argue that prisons should not hold any more people than they already do. In addition, they also cite the disparate impact that America's criminal justice system has on African Americans, a concern that has increased in the wake of the murder of George Floyd.

According to opponents Proposition 20 would have increased the prison population, thereby increasing state and local court, correctional, and law enforcement costs by tens of millions of dollars annually. Had it passed, it would have partially reversed the results of Proposition 47, Proposition 57, and other legislation that have been intended to reduce the prison population and shift the correctional system from a punitive system to a rehabilitative system.

Polling 
In order to pass, it needs a simple majority (>50%).

On proposition 20

On expanding the list of violent crimes for which early release from prison is not an option

On charging repeat theft, when someone is caught for the 3rd time stealing something worth at least $250, as a felony

Notes

References

2020 California ballot propositions
Prison reform
Criminal penalty ballot measures in the United States